Shreveport Downtown Airport  is a public use airport located in the Bossier Parish portion of Shreveport, Louisiana, United States. It is closer to downtown Shreveport than the larger Shreveport Regional Airport. It is owned by the Shreveport Airport Authority.

Facilities and aircraft 
It has two asphalt paved runways: 14/32 is 5,018 by 150 feet (1,529 x 46 m) and 5/23 is 3,200 by 75 feet (975 x 23 m).

For the 12-month period ending May 22, 2008, the airport had 56,539 aircraft operations, an average of 154 per day: 99% general aviation, 1% air taxi and 1% military. At that time there were 142 aircraft based at this airport: 82% single-engine, 15% multi-engine, 1% jet and 1% ultralight.

References

External links 
  at City of Shreveport web site
 
 

Airports in Louisiana
Buildings and structures in Bossier Parish, Louisiana
Transportation in Bossier Parish, Louisiana